Etam is a proper name in the Bible. There are five references to the name Etam in the Hebrew Bible:

Person
 Etam is mentioned in 1 Chronicles 4:3 as a descendant of Judah, likely a son of Hur. Etam is the father of Jezreel, Ishma, Idbash and their sister Hazzelelponi.

Places
Etam (biblical town),  as referenced in 2 Chronicles 11, was located southwest of Bethlehem near Tekoah.
 A village in the tribe of Simeon (1 Chronicles 4:32).
Rock of Etam, a rock where Samson hid.

References

Hebrew Bible cities
Books of Chronicles people